The Delta 72 were an American alternative music band formed in Washington, DC in the summer of 1994, later relocated to Philadelphia, Pennsylvania. They created a frenetic and honest style channeling post-punk sensibilities with 1960s British Invasion R&B.

The original line-up consisted of just Ben Azzara on drums and Gregg Foreman on guitar, harp and vocals. In short succession, friends Sarah Stolfa on Farfisa organ and Kim Thompson of Cupid Car Club on bass guitar were added. After the release of their first single, 'On the Rocks 7"', a joint production of Dischord and Kill Rock Stars records, they toured the United States and played regionally around the Northeast.

After Ben Azzara left the group for The Capitol City Dusters, they were signed to Touch and Go Records in 1995. The line-up now consisted of Gregg Foreman on guitar, harp and vocals, Jason Kourkounis (formerly of Mule) on drums, Kim Thompson on bass and vocals, and Sarah Stolfa on Farfisa organ.

Their first Touch and Go release was in 1996 with the Triple Crown 7” and the album The R&B of Membership. Later releases include several singles, an EP, and the full-length CDs The Soul of a New Machine and 000.

Thompson left in 1996, and was replaced by Bruce Reckahn. Stolfa left in 1998 to be replaced by Mark Boyce (Boss Hog). They disbanded in July 2001.  Gregg Foreman currently plays with Cat Power.

Discography
1994 Self Published - Cassette tapes sold on tour
1995 "On the Rocks" 7" single - (Kill Rock Stars/Dischord)
1996 "Rich Girls..." / "Cinderella" 7" single - (Touch & Go)
1996 The R&B of Membership album - (T&G)
1997 The Soul of a New Machine album - (T&G)
1999 Sorega Doushita EP - (T&G)
2000 000 album - (T&G)
2000 "The Doctor Is In" 7” single - (T&G)

References

External links
Official site
Epitonic page
Touch & Go page
Gregg Foreman interview
Delta 72 - The Early Years
Ben Azzara

Punk blues musical groups
Musical groups established in 1994
Musical groups disestablished in 2001
Touch and Go Records artists
Garage punk groups
Alternative rock groups from Washington, D.C.
American garage rock groups
1994 establishments in Washington, D.C.